The Omingonde Formation is an Early to Middle Triassic (Anisian to Ladinian) geologic formation, part of the Karoo Supergroup, in the western Otjozondjupa Region and northeastern Erongo Region of north-central Namibia.

The Omingonde Formation is correlated with a series of formations in northwestern Argentina and the Paraná Basin in southeastern Brazil, deposited in a larger basinal area, 120 million years before the break-up of Pangea. The formation has provided fossils of several therapsids, amphibians and ichnofossils and belongs to the Cynognathus Assemblage Zone. The Omingonde Formation preserves the most diverse fauna of Middle Triassic cynodonts in the world.

Description 

The Omingonde Formation is named after a water well in Mount Etjo, Namibia. The formation is widespread in the Otjiwarongo, Grootfontein and Omaruru Districts. Main outcrops are south of the Waterberg thrust near Mount Etjo, Omatakos and north of the Waterberg Plateau.

The Omingonde Formation splits naturally into four units, each comprising several upward-fining cycles reflecting distinct architectural characteristics. The lower two units coincide with the Lower and Middle Omingonde Formation, the upper two units make up the Upper Omingonde Formation. Thicknesses and architectural style of the units vary laterally and are influenced by syn-sedimentary tectonic activity of the Waterberg-Omaruru Lineament. The full range of facies is best developed in the Mt. Waterberg area, whereas farther west in the Erongo Region more proximal facies are favored. This proximal facies association has been termed the Krantzberg Formation in the western, northern and eastern Erongo area, and interfingers with the Lions Head Formation towards the southeastern Erongo Region.

The formation comprises red and white colored clastics including conglomerates, sandstones and siltstones. Many units are channelized and show paleosol development. Three major facies are developed in the lower unit, including channelized, trough cross-bedded conglomerates, followed by sandy mudstones, which are interbedded with more massive, pebbly mudstones. The conglomerates are matrix-supported and grade vertically and laterally into sandstones. Their clasts derived dominantly from metasedimentary and granitic rocks. The channels are usually well confined and amalgamation occurs rarely. The sandy mudstones are reddish in colour, they contain lenticular interbeds of fine grained sandstones. They are characterised by a climbing-ripple lamination. Furthermore, the
mudstones contain thin interlayers of blocky calcrete and carbonate nodules with some rhizoliths. Massive pebbly mudstones are restricted to positions very proximal to the Waterberg-Omaruru Fault. They are characterised by a massive matrix-supported texture and a low structural and compositional maturity of both, matrix and clasts.

The Upper Omingonde Formation is best developed in the Mt. Waterberg area, but no occurrences have been found in the Goboboseb-Otjongundu region. The succession begins with a laterally amalgamated channel facies alternating with a sandy mudstone facies. In the upper part of the formation, channels are isolated and only a few meters wide. Up-section, the maturity of channel fills successively increases until well rounded medium to coarse grained sandstones dominate. The architecture remains cyclic with the channel facies alternating with laminated fine grained sandstones and bioturbated mudstones.

Depositional environment 
The Omingonde Formation comprises chiefly braided fluvial deposits, which record semi-arid climatic conditions prevailing until the Upper Omingonde Formation. The latter marks a temporary shift to a wetter climate until semi-arid conditions re-established with the succeeding Etjo Formation. The degree of channel amalgamation and palaeosol development corresponds with sediment discharge rates: More confined meandering channels and extensive palaeosol developments are associated with lower discharge rates rather than amalgamated braided channel systems.

The channel geometries and the low degree of amalgamation in the Lower Omingonde Formation indicate an overall meandering river system. Sandy mudstones were generated during crevasse splays and associated flood stages. Intervals of non-deposition are indicated by immature paleosols, which are represented by scarce rhizoliths and blocky calcretes. In proximal positions to the Waterberg-Omaruru Fault pebbly mudstone units reveal mud flow deposits related to an enhanced fault generated relief.

The Middle Omingonde Formation has been interpreted as a mobile braided stream system due to the well developed trough cross-bedding and upward-fining character of poorly confined channel bodies, together with their sheet-like appearance and ubiquitous vertical and lateral amalgamation. In addition, significant vertical accretion is indicated by the preservation of overbank fines, that abundantly show pedogenic modification. The proximal deposits of the Erongo area show textural and grain size
characteristics of debris flows that amalgamated to form fault-bounded alluvial fan aprons. These fans give evidence for persistent syn-sedimentary activity of the Waterberg Fault system. The Upper Omingonde Formation reflects a progressive change from a braided river system to a more meandering river system with decreasing discharge rates. Temporarily wetter climates are indicated by bioturbated mudstones, that formed in seasonal lakes. Although a hiatus to the overlying Etjo Formation is
proposed, the facies of the Upper Omingonde Formation represents a transitional stage to the facies of the Lower Etjo Formation.

The syn-sedimentary tectonic control on Omingonde deposition is recorded by both thickening of strata towards the Waterberg-Omaruru Fault and by the pronounced shift of the adjacent depocenter, the latter suggesting left-lateral oblique slip movement.

Fossil content 
The formation belongs to the Cynognathus Assemblage Zone as identified by Keyser in 1973; and preserves the most diverse fauna of Middle Triassic cynodonts in the world; the formation is a biostratigraphic link among Middle Triassic faunas from South Africa, Tanzania (Manda Formation), Zambia, Argentina, Brazil, and Antarctica. The cynodonts of the Triassic era are important markers to correlate terrestrial formations. Trirachodon fossils have also been found in the Driekoppen Formation of South Africa.

The following fossils have been reported from the formation:

Amphibians
 Mastodonsauridae indet.

Therapsids

Ichnofossils
 Saurichnium anserinum, S. damarense, S. parallelum, S. tetractis
 Tetrapodium elmenhorsti

Correlations 

The formation is correlated with the lower part of the Santa Maria Formation of the Paraná Basin in Rio Grande do Sul, Brazil. The Chañares Formation of the Ischigualasto-Villa Unión Basin in northwestern Argentina is also time-equivalent with the Omingonde Formation, and similar fauna assemblages as the Omingonde Formation have been reported from the Río Seco de la Quebrada Formation of Argentina. In the Karoo Basin of southern Namibia and the Eastern, Northern and Western Cape, South Africa, the formation is time-equivalent with the Burgersdorp and Elliot Formation. In Antarctica, the formation correlates with the Fremouw Formation.

See also 
 List of fossiliferous stratigraphic units in Namibia
 Geology of Namibia
 Angwa Sandstone
 Beaufort Group
 Huab Formation
 Gondwanide orogeny

References

Bibliography

Further reading 
 
 
 
 
 

 
Geologic formations of Namibia
Triassic System of Africa
Early Triassic Africa
Middle Triassic Africa
Sandstone formations
Siltstone formations
Shale formations
Conglomerate formations
Fluvial deposits
Fossiliferous stratigraphic units of Africa
Paleontology in Namibia
Formations
Formations